The 1993 Latur earthquake struck India at 3:56 am local time (UTC+05:30) on 30 September. The main area affected is the districts of Latur and Osmanabad, including the Ausa block of Latur and Omerga of Osmanabad in Maharashtra, Western India. Fifty-two villages were demolished in the intraplate earthquake. It measured 6.2 on the moment magnitude scale, and approximately 10,000 people died, whilst another 30,000 were injured. The earthquake's hypocenter was around 10 km deep – relatively shallow – allowing shock waves to cause more damage. It is considered the deadliest earthquake in the stable continental crust to have occurred in recorded history.

Because the location does not lie on a plate boundary, there was some debate as to what caused the earthquake. The Indian sub-continent crumples as it pushes against Asia and pressure is released. It is possible that this pressure is released along fault lines. Another argument is that reservoir construction along the Terna was responsible for increasing pressure on fault lines. Killari, where the epicenter of the quake is believed to have been, had a large crater, which remains in place to date.

Background and geology
The Latur area, and indeed peninsular India where it is located,  was previously considered having the least possibility of  seismic activity. Prior to 1967 there had been only three recorded notable earthquakes in peninsular India. The Koyna earthquake, a few hundred miles west of Latur in 1967 was the most recent one. Latur area is  near the eastern end of Deccan Traps formed by flood basalt. The basalt flows in the area are estimated to be 450 meters thick). The terrain is generally  flat.

Geology

Damage and casualties

Details
 Deadliest earthquake in state of Maharashtra.
 Main districts affected were Latur and Osmanabad.
 Occurred around 3.56am IST.
 52 villages affected and destroyed.
 10,000 people killed and 30,000 injured.
 Huge hollow in Killari, epicentre of quake still remains.
 With measurement in moment magnitude scale of 6.4.
 Casualties of being killed and injured high as it being densely populated.
 Shockwaves causing high damage as earthquake focus being 12 km deep.
 Relief teams and rescue workers with support from foreign and local support reached immediately.
 Deaths included many women and children.
 Financial assistance of Rs 46.55 lakhs for handicapped people.
 World Bank offering funding and financial and other assistance for reconstruction of Latur.
 Villagers provided with 299 cattle.

Relief efforts

Several foreign and local donors reacted immediately to the tragedy by sending relief teams and rescue workers. Physicians and staff from Railway Hospital, Solapur and V.M. Medical College, Solapur were amongst the first to reach the site and assisted with treatment of the injured over the next several weeks. The first convoy of over 120 trucks laden with relief material such as tents, blankets, food and clothing, medical supplies and temporary shelters given by international donors departed from Mumbai at around 10am on 2 October 1993. 42nd battalion of MIL, The Indian Army, State Reserve Police Force, Central Reserve Police Force and other law enforcement agencies rushed their personnel almost immediately after the quake, assuming there would be a greater number of casualties.

Amateur radio role

Among the first to respond were amateur radio operators from Mumbai and Hyderabad, who had rushed to Omerga, a town near Latur from where all quake-hit areas could be accessed by road. The Mumbai-based JNA Wireless Association undertook a special mission. With four-wheel drive vehicles given for the purpose by Mahindra and Mahindra, a group of eight Mumbai-based radio hams escorted the supplies convoy from Mumbai to Omerga. Later, the radio operators split into four groups and visited scores of ravaged villages, relaying vital information – such as possible outbreak of disease, food supply and devastation – to a control station set up in Omerga. During the 10-and-a-half-day trip, these radio hams successfully assisted disaster mitigation efforts undertaken by the Indian government and private aid agencies.
For victims help came from whole world and many nations. Indian land lords also made intensive efforts in giving donation and help. Madhavrao Scindia had made highest donation in all over India for rescue and help to victim people.

Aftermath

Current situation

See also

List of earthquakes in 1993
List of earthquakes in India
Geology of Maharashtra
Nanded earthquakes

References

Further reading
 Baumbach, M. & Grosser, Helmut & Schmidt, H. & Paulat, A. & Rietbrock, Andreas & Rao, C. & Raju, P. & Sarkar, D. & Mohan, Indra. (1994). Study of the Foreshocks and Aftershocks of the Intraplate Latur Earthquake of September 30, 1993, India.

External links
  imd.ernet.in: LATUR EARTHQUAKE OF SEPTEMBER 30,1993
 

1993 in India
1993 earthquakes
1993 Latur
History of Maharashtra (1947–present)
History of Latur
September 1993 events in Asia
1993 disasters in India
Rao administration